The Japan national basketball team is administered by the Japan Basketball Association (JBA), (Japanese: 日本バスケットボール協会, Nihon Basukettobōru Kyōkai). At the 1936 founding member of FIBA Asia, Japan has one of Asia's longest basketball traditions.

Japan has one of the most successful basketball teams in Asia. It has won the Asian Basketball Championships twice and is the second leading nation in qualifications to the event. The team qualified for the Olympic Games 7 times and for the FIBA World Cup six times.

History

The beginning (1917–1936)
Japan's national team had its first international tournament at the 3rd Far Eastern Games held in Tokyo in 1917, at which Japan was represented by the team of the Kyoto YMCA.

Later, the team was a founding member of the Olympics Basketball competition in Berlin 1936.

Establishment as a competitor at the global stage (1937–1976)
After 1936, Japan Henceforth, they participated almost every time until 1976. Team Japan was a regular at world tournaments. It had its debut at the FIBA World Championship in 1963. It was the top team in Asia, as it won the championship there in 1965 and 1971.

At the 1976 Summer Olympics, Japan's Shigeaki Abe put up a noteworthy performance of 38 points and 10 assists gainst Puerto Rico.

Since the rise of China, Japan declined a little bit and appearances at global events became scarcer.

Continued success (1995–1998)
As runner-up at the Fukuoka Universiade in 1995, Team Nippon (as the Japanese are also called) had a streak of success and qualified for the 1998 FIBA World Championship, its first qualification in over 30 years. Coached by the Croat Željko Pavličević, the team played well but did not make it out of the primary round, where it lost its fourth-place battle against former Semi-finalist New Zealand.

Competition from the Middle East intensifies (1999–2009)
In the late 1990s, Japan played against more intense competition from the Middle East. Combined with many player absences from the team, Team Nippon struggled to win medals at the Asian Championships since its silver medal in 1997. At the 2008 event in their home country (Tokushima), the team finished at the 8th position and missed qualification for both the Beijing Olympic Tournament and qualification to the 2010 FIBA World Championship. At the 2009 FIBA Asia tournament the team sank to No. 10 position, its worst performance. This was partly due to the change of the head coach just before the tournament.

Recovery (2010–present)
Overshadowed by the drawbacks at international competitions, Japan brought forth several of Asia's elite basketball players who competed in the NBA and in Europe. These players included Yuta Tabuse, J.R. Sakuragi, Takuya Kawamura, Takumi Ishizaki and others. However, they rarely played for the national team, which caused Team Japan to fall behind Asia's elite competition from Iran, South Korea, the Philippines and China.

To better the results, the American coach Thomas Wisman took over the management of the team in 2010 and made some considerable improvements. Wisman just came off a phenomenal year in the Japanese Basketball League (JBL) where he had led Tochigi Brex to its first and only national title. At the FIBA Asia Stankovic Cup in 2010, Team Nippon was defeated by host Lebanon but exceeded expectations as it finished as runner-up. At the 2011 FIBA Asia Championship, the listed goal of the Final Four was missed as the team reached the 7th position out of 15. The team managed to defeat finalists Jordan but then lost to South Korea in the first playoff round and was defeated.

In March 2012, the Japan Association dismissed Wissmann and the country's coaching legend Kimikazu Suzuki took over the reins of the team. Suzuki, concurrently coaching the Aisin SeaHorses Mikawa had initial success as Team Nippon finished Runner-up at the next FIBA Asian Cup which was held in Tokyo in September 2012. Aimed at the acquisition of a 2014 FIBA World Cup berth, the team finished the 2013 FIBA Asia Championship at the 9th position where it lost its last three games.

In 2014, Yuta Tabuse and several of Japan's top players returned to the national team and helped to reach its best finish in almost 20 years.

Japan will co-host the 2023 FIBA Basketball World Cup along with Philippines and Indonesia.

Competitive record

Olympic Games

FIBA World Cup

FIBA Asia Cup

Asian Games

1951: 
1954: 
1958: 
1962: 
1966: 4th
1970: 
1974: 7th
1978: 4th
1982: 
1986: 6th
1990: 4th
1994: 
1998: 10th
2002: 6th
2006: 6th
2010: 4th
2014: 
2018: 7th
2022: To be determined

East Asian Games

1993: 5th
1997: 5th
2001: 
2005: 
2009: 
2013: 4th

Team

2020 Olympic roster

Depth chart

Head coaches

Past rosters
1936 Olympic Games: finished 13th among 21 teams

Riichi Cho, T.Nakae, S.Ri, K.Yokoyama, T.Kanakogi, M.Maeda, U.Munakata, S.Matsui

1956 Olympic Games: finished 10th among 15 teams

Setsuo Nara, Jose Rodriguez, Kenichi Imaizumi, Hiroshi Saito, Reizo Ohira, Hitoshi Konno, Takashi Itoyama, Manabu Fujita, Takeo Sugiyama, Tetsuro Noborisaka, Riichi Arai (Coach: M.Maeda)

1960 Olympic Games: finished 15th among 16 teams

Setsuo Nara, Shutaro Shoji, Hiroshi Saito, Takashi Itoyama, Takeo Sugiyama, Kenichi Imaizumi, Yasukuni Oshima, Shoji Kamata, Masashi Shiga, Takashi Masuda, Kaoru Wakabayashi, Hideo Kanekawa (Coach: M.Maeda)

1963 World Championship: finished 13th among 13 teams

Setsuo Nara, Takashi Masuda, Masashi Shiga, Yasukuni Oshima, Kaoru Wakabayashi, Keizo Okayama, Isamu Yamaguchi, Yoshikuni Awano, Fumihiko Moroyama, Katsuji Tsunoda, Kunihiko Nakamura, Yoshitaka Egawa (Coach: Shiro Yoshii)

1964 Olympic Games: finished 10th among 16 teams

Takashi Masuda, Setsuo Nara, Masashi Shiga, Kaoru Wakabayashi, Fumihiko Moroyama, Katsuji Tsunoda, Kunihiko Nakamura, Yoshitaka Egawa, Nobuo Kaiho, Akira Kodama, Katsuo Bai, Seiji Fujie (Coach: Marco Antonio de Venetis)

1967 World Championship: finished 11th among 13 teams

Kaoru Wakabayashi, Fumihiko Moroyama, Kunihiko Nakamura, Yoshitaka Egawa, Akira Kodama, Masatomo Taniguchi, Nobuo Hattori, Kenji Soda, Masahiko Yoshida, Isao Kimura, Seiji Igarashi (Coach: Shutaro Shoji)

1972 Olympic Games: finished 14th among 16 teams

Kenji Soda, Masatomo Taniguchi, Nobuo Hattori, Kunihiko Yokoyama, Atsushi Somamoto, Hirofumi Numata, Shigeaki Abe, Mineo Yoshikawa, Kazufumi Sakai, Nobuo Chigusa, Satoshi Mori, Katsuhiko Sugita (Coach: S.Kasahara)

1976 Olympic Games: finished 11th among 12 teams

Hirofumi Numata, Shigeaki Abe, Satoshi Mori, Norihiko Kitahara, Hideki Hamaguchi, Kiyohide Kuwata, Koji Yamamoto, Yutaka Fujimoto, Shigeto Shimizu, Fumio Saito, Nobuo Chigusa, Shoji Yuki (Coach: Masahiko Yoshida)

1998 World Championship: finished 14th among 16 teams

Kenichi Sako, Maikeru Takahashi, Akifumi Yamasaki, Hiroshi Nagano, Makoto Hasegawa, Takehiko Orimo, Satoshi Sakumoto, Hiroyuki Tominaga, Takahiro Setsumasa, Makoto Minamiyama, Takeshi Yuki, Satoru Furuta (Coach: Mototaka Kohama)

2006 World Championship: finished 20th among 24 teams

Takehiko Orimo, Satoru Furuta, Takahiro Setsumasa, Shunsuke Ito, Joji Takeuchi, Kei Igarashi, Shinsuke Kashiwagi, Daiji Yamada, Ryota Sakurai, Kosuke Takeuchi, Takuya Kawamura, Tomoo Amino (Coach: Zeljko Pavlicevic)

Roster for the 2016 FIBA World Olympic Qualifying Tournaments:
}

At the 2016 FIBA Asia Challenge.
}

Kit

Manufacturer
2015–2019 : Under Armour
2021–present : Nike, Inc.

Sponsor
2015: Xebio
2016: Sportsnavi live
2017–2019: SoftBank

See also
Japan women's national basketball team
Japan national under-19 basketball team
Japan national under-17 basketball team
Japan national 3x3 team

References

External links

FIBA profile
Japan Basketball Records at FIBA Archive

Videos
Japan – Highlights – 2015 FIBA Asia Championship YouTube.com video
Japan Offense Highlights – FIBA Asia Cup 2017  YouTube.com video

 
Men's national basketball teams
Basketball in Japan
1936 establishments in Japan
Sports clubs founded by the YMCA